Balulu was the final king of the First Dynasty of Ur, according to the Sumerian King List, which states he ruled for 36 years: 

Both his reign and the dynasty came to an end when he was defeated by a king of Awan.

References

Sumerian kings
26th-century BC Sumerian kings
First Dynasty of Ur